Theory of language is a topic from philosophy of language and theoretical linguistics. It has the goal of answering the questions "What is language?"; "Why do languages have the properties they have?"; or "What is the origin of language?".

Even though much of the research in linguistics is descriptive or prescriptive, there exists an underlying assumption that terminological and methodological choices reflect the researcher's opinion of language. Linguists are divided into different schools of thinking, with the nature–nurture debate as the main divide. Some linguistics conferences and journals are focussed on a specific theory of language, while others disseminate a variety of views.

Like in other human and social sciences, theories in linguistics can be divided into humanistic and sociobiological approaches. Same terms, for example 'rationalism', 'functionalism', 'formalism' and 'constructionism', are used with different meanings in different contexts.

Humanistic theories

Humanistic theories consider people as having an agentive role in the social construction of language. Language is primarily seen as a sociocultural phenomenon. This tradition emphasises culture, nurture, creativity and diversity. A classical rationalist approach to language stems from the philosophy Age of Enlightenment. Rationalist philosophers, excluding Jean-Jacques Rousseau, who advocated innatism, believed that people had created language in a step-by-step process to serve their psychological need to communicate with each other. Thus, language is thought of as a rational human invention.

Cultural–historical approaches

During the 19th century, when sociological questions remained under psychology, languages and language change were thought of as arising from human psychology and the collective unconscious mind of the community, shaped by its history, as argued by Moritz Lazarus, Heymann Steinthal and Wilhelm Wundt. Advocates of Völkerpsychologie ('folk psychology') regarded language as Volksgeist; a social phenomenon conceived as the 'spirit of the nation'.

Wundt claimed that the human mind becomes organised according to the principles of syllogistic reasoning with social progress and education. He argued for a binary-branching model for the description of the mind, and syntax. Folk psychology was imported to North American linguistics by Franz Boas and Leonard Bloomfield who were the founders of a school of thought which was later nicknamed 'American structuralism'.

Folk psychology became associated with German nationalism, and after World War I Bloomfield apparently replaced Wundt's structural psychology with Albert Paul Weiss's behavioral psychology; although Wundtian notions remained elementary for his linguistic analysis. The Bloomfieldian school of linguistics was eventually reformed as a sociobiological approach by Noam Chomsky (see 'generative grammar' below).

Since generative grammar's popularity began to wane towards the end of the 20th century, there has been a new wave of cultural anthropological approaches to the language question sparking a modern debate on the relationship of language and culture. Participants include Daniel Everett, Jesse Prinz, Nicholas Evans and Stephen Levinson.

Structuralism: a sociological–semiotic theory
The study of culture and language developed in a different direction in Europe where Émile Durkheim successfully separated sociology from psychology, thus establishing it as an autonomous science. Ferdinand de Saussure likewise argued for the autonomy of linguistics from psychology. He created a semiotic theory which would eventually give rise to the movement in human sciences known as structuralism, followed by functionalism or functional structuralism, post-structuralism and other similar tendencies. The names structuralism and functionalism are derived from Durkheim's modification of Herbert Spencer's organicism which draws an analogy between social structures and the organs of an organism, each necessitated by its function.

Saussure approaches the essence of language from two sides. For the one, he borrows ideas from Steinthal and Durkheim, concluding that language is a 'social fact'. For the other, he creates a theory of language as a system in and for itself which arises from the association of concepts and words or expressions. Thus, language is a dual system of interactive sub-systems: a conceptual system and a system of linguistic forms. Neither of these can exist without the other because, in Saussure's notion, there are no (proper) expressions without meaning, but also no (organised) meaning without words or expressions. Language as a system does not arise from the physical world, but from the contrast between the concepts, and the contrast between the linguistic forms.

Functionalism: language as a tool for communication 
There was a shift of focus in sociology in the 1920s, from structural to functional explanation, or the adaptation of the social 'organism' to its environment. Post-Saussurean linguists, led by the Prague linguistic circle, began to study the functional value of the linguistic structure, with communication taken as the primary function of language in the meaning 'task' or 'purpose'. These notions translated into an increase of interest in pragmatics, with a discourse perspective (the analysis of full texts) added to the multilayered interactive model of structural linguistics. This gave rise to functional linguistics.

Formalism: language as a mathematical–semiotic system 
Structural and formal linguist Louis Hjelmslev considered the systemic organisation of the bilateral linguistic system fully mathematical, rejecting the psychological and sociological aspect of linguistics altogether. He considered linguistics as the comparison of the structures of all languages using formal grammars – semantic and discourse structures included. Hjelmslev's idea is sometimes referred to as 'formalism'.

Although generally considered as a structuralist, Lucien Tesnière regarded meaning as giving rise to expression, but not vice versa, at least as regards the relationship between semantics and syntax. He considered the semantic plane as psychological, but syntax as being based on the necessity to break the two-dimensional semantic representation into linear form.

Post-structuralism: language as a societal tool 
The Saussurean idea of language as an interaction of the conceptual system and the expressive system was elaborated in philosophy, anthropology and other fields of human sciences by Claude Lévi-Strauss, Roland Barthes, Michel Foucault, Jacques Derrida, Julia Kristeva and many others. This movement was interested in the Durkheimian concept of language as a social fact or a rule-based code of conduct; but eventually rejected the structuralist idea that the individual cannot change the norm. Post-structuralists study how language affects our understanding of reality thus serving as a tool of shaping society.

Language as an artificial construct 
While the humanistic tradition stemming from 19th century Völkerpsychologie emphasises the unconscious nature of the social construction of language, some perspectives of post-structuralism and social constructionism regard human languages as man-made rather than natural. At this end of the spectrum, structural linguist Eugenio Coșeriu laid emphasis on the intentional construction of language. Daniel Everett has likewise approached the question of language construction from the point of intentionality and free will.

There were also some contacts between structural linguists and the creators of constructed languages. For example, Saussure's brother René de Saussure was an Esperanto activist, and the French functionalist André Martinet served as director of the International Auxiliary Language Association.

Sociobiological theories

In contrast to humanistic linguistics, sociobiological approaches consider language as a biological phenomena. Approaches to language as part of cultural evolution can be roughly divided into two main groups: genetic determinism which argues that languages stem from the human genome; and social Darwinism, as envisioned by August Schleicher and Max Müller, which applies principles and methods of evolutionary biology to linguistics. Because sociobiogical theories have been labelled as chauvinistic in the past, modern approaches, including Dual inheritance theory and memetics, aim to provide more sustainable solutions to the study of biology's role in language.

Language as a genetically inherited phenomenon

Strong version ('rationalism') 
The role of genes in language formation has been discussed and studied extensively. Proposing generative grammar, Noam Chomsky argues that language is fully caused by a random genetic mutation, and that linguistics is the study of universal grammar, or the structure in question. Others, including Ray Jackendoff, point out that the innate language component could be the result of a series of evolutionary adaptations; Steven Pinker argues that, because of these, people are born with a language instinct.

The random and the adaptational approach are sometimes referred to as formalism (or structuralism) and functionalism (or adaptationism), respectively, as a parallel to debates between advocates of structural and functional explanation in biology. Also known as biolinguistics, the study of linguistic structures is parallelised with that of natural formations such as ferromagnetic droplets and botanic forms. This approach became highly controversial at the end of the 20th century due to a lack of empirical support for genetics as an explanation of linguistic structures.

More recent anthropological research aims to avoid genetic determinism. Behavioural ecology and dual inheritance theory, the study of gene–culture co-evolution, emphasise the role of culture as a human invention in shaping the genes, rather than vice versa. It is known, for example, that since early humans started developing their language, the process paved way for genetic changes that would affect the vocal tract.

Weak version ('empiricism') 
Some former generative grammarians argue that genes may nonetheless have an indirect effect on abstract features of language. This makes up yet another approach referred to as 'functionalism' which makes a weaker claim with respect to genetics. Instead of arguing for a specific innate structure, it is suggested that human physiology and neurological organisation may give rise to linguistic phenomena in a more abstract way.

Based on a comparison of structures from multiple languages, John A. Hawkins suggests that the brain, as a syntactic parser, may find it easier to process some word orders than others, thus explaining their prevalence. This theory remains to be confirmed by psycholinguistic studies.

Conceptual metaphor theory from George Lakoff's cognitive linguistics hypothesises that people have inherited from lower animals the ability for deductive reasoning based on visual thinking, which explains why languages make so much use of visual metaphors.

Languages as species
It was thought in early evolutionary biology that languages and species can be studied according to the same principles and methods. The idea of languages and cultures as fighting for living space became highly controversial as it was accused of being a pseudoscience that caused two world wars, and social Darwinism was banished from humanities by 1945. In the concepts of Schleicher and Müller, both endorsed by Charles Darwin, languages could be either organisms or populations.

A neo-Darwinian version of this idea was introduced as memetics by Richard Dawkins in 1976. In this thinking, ideas and cultural units, including words, are compared to viruses or replicators. Although meant as a softer alternative to genetic determinism, memetics has been widely discredited as pseudoscience, and it has failed to establish itself as a recognised field of scientific research. The language–species analogy nonetheless continues to enjoy popularity in linguistics and other human sciences. Since the 1990s there have been numerous attempts to revive it in various guises. As Jamin Pelkey explains,Theorists who explore such analogies usually feel obliged to pin language to some specific sub-domain of biotic growth. William James selects "zoölogical evolution", William Croft prefers botanical evolution, but most theorists zoom in to more microbiotic levels – some claiming that linguistic phenomena are analogous to the cellular level and others arguing for the genetic level of biotic growth. For others, language is a parasite; for others still, language is a virus ... The disagreements over grounding analogies do not stop here.Like many other approaches to linguistics, these, too, are collectively called 'functionalism'. They include various frameworks of usage-based linguistics, language as a complex adaptive system, construction grammar, emergent linguistics, and others.

References

Theories of language